Stroncatura (or struncatura in the Calabrian dialect) is a typical pasta dish of Calabrian cuisine, and in particular of Gioia Tauro. Although currently widespread throughout Calabria, the area of greatest sale and consumption is to be considered the Tyrrhenian belt of the Province of Reggio Calabria. The main component of the dish is a pasta resembling linguine made with the residues of flour and bran from the milling of wheat. The wholemeal wheat and rye give it its rough and coarse appearance. 

At one time, stroncatura was illegal to sell, because of its unhygienic origins from mill waste floor sweepings, and only eaten by the poor. Its production is now hygienic, and it has become a mainstream dish.

Thanks to its shape and its particular mixture, it holds the sauce very well. It is generally seasoned with typical ingredients of the peasant tradition such as extra virgin olive oil, garlic, Calabrian chilli, olives, anchovies and toasted breadcrumbs.

References 

Types of pasta
Italian words and phrases
Cuisine of Calabria